Almudena is a feminine Spanish given name. Notable people with the name include:

Almudena Bernabeu, Spanish lawyer
Almudena Cid Tostado (born 1980), Spanish rhythmic gymnast
Almudena Fernández (born 1974), Spanish model
Almudena Gallardo (born 1979), Spanish archer
Almudena Gracia Manzano (born 1971), Spanish actress, singer, and TV presenter
Almudena Grandes (born 1960), Spanish writer
Almudena Muñoz (born 1968), Spanish judoka
Almudena Suarez, Spanish engineer

Spanish feminine given names